U.S. Route 26 (US 26) runs east–west across south central Idaho for . US 26 enters the state from Oregon across the Snake River east of Nyssa, Oregon concurrent with US 20 and exits into Wyoming northwest of Alpine. US 26 runs through the large population centers of Boise and Idaho Falls, as well as the smaller communities of Parma, Notus, Garden City, Shoshone, Richfield, Carey, Arco, Blackfoot, Swan Valley, and Irwin.

For a vast majority of its route, US 26 is two-lane and rural, with the exception of portions in and around major towns and cities. It does have significant four-lane segments within the Boise metropolitan area and east of Idaho Falls. Despite its extensive length, US 26 has many hundreds of miles that run concurrently with other highways. In fact, its first  in the state consists of concurrencies with any one of five different highways, principally US 20 and I-84. It has additional lengthy concurrencies with US 93, US 20 again, and I-15.

US 26 does have one business route in the state of Idaho, which runs through the small community of Ririe northeast of Idaho Falls.

Route description

Oregon state line to Downtown Boise
After crossing the Snake River at the Oregon state line, US 26 and US 20 make a curve towards US 95. At that point, both routes travel south along US 95. The three routes then travel south and then curves southeast in Parma. Then, US 95 branches southward while the rest continues southeast. Both US 26 and US 20 pass through Notus before meeting I-84/US 30. At this point, the four routes meet I-84 BL and then 10th Avenue before US 20 and US 26 travel east on Franklin Road; all of the exits are in Caldwell.

As the two routes approach Boise, they intersect three state highways: SH-16, SH-55 in Eagle–Boise line, and SH-44 in Garden City. Just after the freeway crosses the Boise River, both routes traveling eastbound serve River Street and Bogus Basin. After this, the freeway approaches a  curve and then becomes an at-grade one-way pair.

Downtown Boise to Blackfoot
As both routes exit downtown, they turn south and become a two-way street. Also, the two routes cross the Boise River for the second time. After that, they run along the eastern edge of the Boise State University. As they approach Boise Airport, they then turn east onto I-84/US 30 again. Along the way, the freeway serves several state highways, I-84 Business Loops, and local roads in different locations. At one point east of Mountain Home, US 20 leaves the freeway and travels northeastward. As the freeway reaches Bliss, US 30, along with I-84 BL, leaves the freeway as Thousand Springs Scenic Byway. At the next exit, US 26 leaves the freeway.

US 26 went on to serve a handful of state highways in Gooding and Shoshone. Also in Shoshone, the route begins to run concurrently with US 93. Both routes then serve Richfield. In Carey, they begin to run concurrently with US 20. For US 26, this is the second time in Idaho. The three routes serve Craters of the Moon National Monument and Preserve and Blizzard Mountain Ski Area. In Arco, US 93 branches northwestward. The rest continues eastward through Butte City and serving SH-33. Just southeast of the base of Idaho National Laboratory, US 26 branches southeast towards Blackfoot while US 20 continues east. As US 26 approaches Blackfoot, the route intersects SH-39 and then crosses over the same Snake River. Shortly after that, it turns northeast onto I-15 while the road continues as I-15 BL.

Blackfoot to Wyoming state line
At this point, US 26 begins to run concurrently with I-15 for the next . All of the interchanges within this concurrency lead to local roads. As the freeway enters Idaho Falls, US 26 leaves the freeway and turns east along I-15 BL. Both routes then cross the Snake River (third time for US 26) and then intersect the northern terminus of US 91. At this point, both travel north toward downtown Idaho Falls. In downtown, I-15 BL branches westward towards I-15/US 20. Continuing northeast, US 26 intersects several more routes: SH-43 in Beachs Corner, US 26 Bus. (twice) near Ririe, and SH-31 in Swan Valley. Continuing eastward, US 26 travels along the bank of Snake River and then enters Wyoming.

History
When US 26 was initially designated in the state in 1951, it ran only as far west as Idaho Falls. The next year, it was extended into Oregon.

In the Idaho Falls area, US 26 runs along local streets and county roads. In 2022, the Idaho Transportation Board approved a study into relocating parts of the highway onto US 20 following the reconstruction of the I-15/US 20 interchange at the west end of the Rigby Freeway.

Major intersections

Ririe business route

U.S. Route 26 Business (US 26 Bus.) is a  business route in and around the small town of Ririe northeast of Idaho Falls. It connects US 26 to the community as well as SH-48.

References

 Idaho
Transportation in Canyon County, Idaho
Transportation in Ada County, Idaho
Transportation in Elmore County, Idaho
Transportation in Gooding County, Idaho
Transportation in Lincoln County, Idaho
Transportation in Blaine County, Idaho
Transportation in Butte County, Idaho
Transportation in Bingham County, Idaho
Transportation in Bonneville County, Idaho
26